Slate Mills may refer to:

Slate Mills, Ohio, an unincorporated community in Ross County
Slate Mills, Virginia, an unincorporated community in Rappahannock County